Edward Winnington  may refer to:
 Sir Edward Winnington, 1st Baronet (c.1728–1791)
 Sir Edward Winnington, 2nd Baronet (1749–1805)